Cercosaura doanae is a species of lizard in the family Gymnophthalmidae. The species is endemic to Peru.

Etymology
The specific name, doanae, is in honor of herpetologist Tiffany M. Doan

Geographic range
C. doanae is found in Mariscal Cáceres Province, Department of San Martín, Peru.

References

Further reading
Echevarría, Lourdes Y.; Barboza, Andy C.; Venegas, Pablo J. (2015). "A new species of montane gymnphthalmid lizard, genus Cercosaura (Squamata: Gymnophthalmidae), from the Amazon slope of northern Peru". Amphibian & Reptile Conservation 9 (1) [Special Section]: 34-44 (e109). (Cercosaura doanae, new species).

Cercosaura
Reptiles of Peru
Endemic fauna of Peru
Reptiles described in 2015
Taxa named by Lourdes Y. Echevarría
Taxa named by Andy C. Barboza
Taxa named by Pablo J. Venegas